Lafayette is a census-designated place in the center of Deer Creek Township, Madison County, Ohio, United States.

History

Lawrenceville
In 1816, Angus Ross opened Lawrenceville's first and only tavern. The Lawrenceville Post Office was established on July 2, 1825. In 1836-7, the National Road was completed through the township, missing Lawrenceville, and the town immediately began to die. By 1915, the original community was nothing more than pasture land, with no signs left to indicate there was ever a community.

Lafayette
Lafayette was laid out on October 1, 1834, by William Minter, and named in honor of Gilbert du Motier, marquis de Lafayette.  On December 31, 1836, the Lawenceville Post Office was moved to Lafayette, and renamed Lafayette Post Office, with John Minter as the first postmaster of the new branch.  As of 1875, the community contained one drug store, one dry goods and grocery store, and one blacksmith shop.  The post office was discontinued on December 31, 1905, with mail service going through the London branch.  As of 1915, the community contained three general stores and one blacksmith shop.

Lafayette is also home to the Red Brick Tavern, one of 11 properties on the National Register of Historic Places listings in Madison County, Ohio.

Demographics
The population of Lafayette was 160 in 1875, and 75 in 1915. As of the 2010 U.S. Census it is 202.

References

Census-designated places in Madison County, Ohio
Census-designated places in Ohio